The king horseshoe bat (Rhinolophus rex) is a species of bat in the family Rhinolophidae. It is endemic to the east coast of China.

References

Mammals of China
Rhinolophidae
Mammals described in 1923
Taxonomy articles created by Polbot
Taxa named by Glover Morrill Allen
Bats of Asia